

"Cordell" as a surname

 Alexander Cordell, pen name of George Graber, Sri Lankan-Welsh novelist
 LaDoris Hazzard Cordell, American retired judge of the Supreme Court of California

"Cordell" as a given name
 Cordell Annesley (d. 1636) English courtier
 Cordell Barker (born 1957), Canadian animator
 Cordell Crockett (born 1965), American bassist
 Cordell Hull (1871–1955), American national politician, Secretary of State, and Nobel laureate
 Cordell Jackson (1923–2004), American guitarist and entrepreneur
 Cordell Mosson (born 1952), American musician
 Cordell Volson (born 1998), American football player

Geography
 Cordell, Kentucky, a community in the United States
 New Cordell, Oklahoma, a community in the United States

Films
 Matt Cordell, character from the films series Maniac Cop
 Cordell Walker, main character in Walker, Texas Ranger
 Cordell Doemling, character in  Hannibal

Music
 A song by The Cranberries released as a bonus track on To the Faithful Departed